Wang Wenhua is the name of:

Wang Wenhua (writer) (born 1967), contemporary Taiwanese novelist
Wang Wenhua (footballer) (born 1977), former Chinese footballer, currently a coach
Chin Peng (1924–2013), born as Wang Wenhua, a Malaysian politician